

Organization summary 

The Corning Intown District Management Association (CIDMA), better known as Corning's Gaffer District, is a historical district in downtown Corning, New York.  The district is known for diverse offerings, including world-class museums, nationally acclaimed restaurants, unique, independently owned shops and businesses, historical landmarks and public art stops.  The Gaffer District is home to Fortune 500 company Corning Incorporated as well as The Corning Museum of Glass and Rockwell Museum.

Events  

Corning's Gaffer District is known for its tradition of events, the Corning Farmers Market and nationally recognized festivals.  Events include GlassFest, the Harvest Music Festival and the Crystal City Christmas season, which includes events such as Window of Gifts, The Tree Lighting Celebration, The Parade of Lights and Sparkle. Market Street serves as the finish line for the Wineglass Marathon.

Trails 
There are a number of walking trails that offer themed experiences in the Gaffer District.  As of 2015, there are four self-guided experiences: The Antiques & Collectibles Trail, The Chocolate Trail, The Edible Excursions Trail and The Buildings Alive! Historic & Architectural Walking Tour.  Each trail has a unique variety of theme-related events, characteristics or merchants that appeal to each target group.

External links
Corning's Gaffer District

List of Businesses in Corning's Gaffer District

Corning, New York